Ledsham is a civil parish in the metropolitan borough of the City of Leeds, West Yorkshire, England.  The parish contains twelve listed buildings that are recorded in the National Heritage List for England.  Of these, two are listed at Grade I, the highest of the three grades, and the others are at Grade II, the lowest grade.  The parish contains the village of Ledsham and the surrounding countryside.  Most of the listed buildings are in the village, and consist of houses and farmhouses, almshouses, a former orphanage, a former school, a church, a former vicarage with a walled garden, and a telephone kiosk.  Outside the village, to the north is a former hunting lodge, and to the south are the ruins of a manor house.


Key

Buildings

References

Citations

Sources

 

Lists of listed buildings in West Yorkshire